Pearl of Great Price may refer to:

Parable of the Pearl, a parable told by Jesus in explaining the value of the Kingdom of Heaven
Pearl (poem), a Middle English alliterative poem written in the late 14th century
Pearl of Great Price (Mormonism), part of the standard works of The Church of Jesus Christ of Latter-day Saints
Pearl of Great Price (album), 1991 album by industrial music band Will

See also
Hymn of the Pearl, a passage of the apocryphal Acts of Thomas

New Testament words and phrases